Tom Regan (November 28, 1938 – February 17, 2017) was an American philosopher who specialized in animal rights theory. He was professor emeritus of philosophy at North Carolina State University, where he had taught from 1967 until his retirement in 2001.

Regan was the author of numerous books on the philosophy of animal rights, including The Case for Animal Rights (1983), one of a handful of studies that have significantly influenced the modern animal rights movement. In these, he argued that non-human animals are what he called the "subjects-of-a-life", just as humans are, and that, if we want to ascribe value to all human beings regardless of their ability to be rational agents, then to be consistent, we must similarly ascribe it to non-humans.

From 1985, he served with his wife Nancy as co-founder and co-president of the Culture and Animals Foundation, a nonprofit organization "committed to fostering the growth of intellectual and artistic endeavors united by a positive concern for animals."

The Vegan Society remembers him as "a stalwart vegan and activist."

Education and career
Regan graduated from Thiel College in 1960, receiving his M.A. in 1962 and his PhD in 1966 from the University of Virginia. He taught philosophy at North Carolina State University from 1967 until 2001. Regan directed the 1986 film We Are All Noah which is available on VHS videotape.

Animal rights

In The Case for Animal Rights, Regan argued that non-human animals bear moral rights. His philosophy aligns broadly within the tradition of Immanuel Kant, though he rejects Kant's idea that respect is due only to rational beings. Regan points out that we routinely ascribe inherent value, and thus the right to be treated with respect, to humans who are not rational, including infants and the severely mentally impaired.

The crucial attribute that all humans have in common, he argues, is not rationality, but the fact that each of us has a life that matters to us; in other words, what happens to us matters to us, regardless of whether it matters to anyone else. In Regan's terminology, we each experience being the "subject-of-a-life." If this is the true basis for ascribing inherent value to individuals, to be consistent we must ascribe inherent value, and hence moral rights, to all subjects-of-a-life, whether human or non-human. The basic right that all who possess inherent value have, he argues, is the right never to be treated merely as a means to the ends of others.

In Regan's view, not to be used as a means entails the right to be treated with respect, which includes the right not to be harmed. This right, however, is not absolute, as, there are times when to respect someone' s right not to be harmed, another' s right not to be harmed must be overridden. His philosophy employs principles such as the miniride principle (a.k.a. minimize overriding) and the worse-off principle to deal with these situations. The miniride principle is that when faced with overriding the rights of many innocent beings versus the rights of few innocent beings—when each individual involved would be equally harmed—we should override the rights of the few. The worse-off principle states that, when individuals involved are not harmed in a comparable way given a certain course of action, we should mitigate the situation of those who would be worse-off. Thus, if the harm of a few innocent beings is greater than the harm to many innocent beings, the right action is to override the rights of the many. As this relates to animal rights, Regan asserts the harm in the death of an animal is not tantamount to the harm in the death of a normal, healthy human. This is supposedly because the ending of an animal life entails the loss of fewer opportunities when compared to the loss of a normal, healthy human. According to Regan, there would be more harm in the death of a normal, healthy dog than there would be in the death of a person who was irreversibly comatose, as the dog would have more opportunities for satisfaction than the irreversibly comatose human.

Supporters argue that Regan's argument for animal rights does not rely on a radical new theory of ethics, but that it follows from a consistent application of moral principles and insights that many of us already hold with respect to the ethical treatment of human beings. However, others criticize the lack of certainty with which Regan's "inherent value" or "subject-of-a-life" status can be determined, and note that the sufficient conditions he lists—for example, having sense-perceptions, beliefs, desires, motives, and memory—in effect reduce to "similarity to humans".

According to Regan, it follows from the ascription to animals of the basic right to be treated with respect that we should abolish the breeding of animals for food, animal experimentation, and commercial hunting. Starting as a leather-wearing, circus-visiting meat eater, a series of musings, experiences, and insights led him to conclude he was morally unable to use animals for meat, clothing, or any other purpose that does not respect their rights.

G. E. Moore scholarship

In the 1980s, Regan published three books on G. E. Moore's philosophy. The first book, G. E. Moore: The Early Essays, is a collection of essays that were originally published between 1897 and 1903, none of which Moore himself anthologized. Regan argues that these papers reveal Moore' s early taste for speculative metaphysics; in "The Nature of Judgment", for example, Moore maintains that "the world consists of concepts", including existence, "which is itself a concept . . . Thus, all that exists . . . is composed of concepts necessarily related to one another in specific manners, and likewise to the concept of existence." In another paper, "Freedom", Moore enthusiastically affirms his agreement with F. H. Bradley, writing: "I can only say that the arguments by which Mr. Bradley has endeavoured to prove the unreality of Time appear to me perfectly conclusive."

Regan' s second book, The Elements of Ethics, is a series of ten lectures Moore delivered in 1898. Large parts of these lectures were carried over by Moore into Principia Ethica and, Regan maintains, these lectures cast important light on Principia' s pages.

Regan' s third book, Bloomsbury' s Prophet: G. E. Moore and the Development of His Moral Philosophy, represents Regan' s major contribution to Moorean scholarship. Representative reviews include E. D. Klemke writing that Bloomsbury' s Prophet is "a marvelous book", while Aurum Stroll writes "[t]he portrait of the man Moore that Regan gives us is not only unique . . . but it is well done, indeed."

In this book, Regan relies on a trove of unpublished material, housed in the Moore Archive at the University of Cambridge, including Moore' s two dissertations, on Kant' s moral philosophy; correspondence, consisting of letters that Moore wrote as well those he received; scores of papers he read at meetings of the Cambridge Conversazione Society, also known as the Apostles, and at the Sunday Essay Society; and a diary Moore kept throughout his formative years, breaking off on April 19, 1916.

Using these materials, Regan argues that Principias primary purpose was (as Moore wrote) to "humble the Science of Ethics" by exposing the "lies" told by "would-be scientific ethicists" ("Art, Morals, and Religion": May 5, 1901). In Moore' s view, a truly scientific ethic is able to prove very little concerning values, rules, duty, and virtues.

Regarding values: such an ethic cannot establish anything concerning what has intrinsic value—what is good in itself. That must be left to the judgment of individuals who, taking due precautions, ask themselves what things would be good if they were the only things to exist in the world.

Regarding rules of conduct: a truly scientific ethic can at most establish that "a very few rules" (Principia, xxii, italics in the original) ought always to be followed. Not even all the rules commended by Common Sense qualify: only "most of those most universally recognized by Common Sense" are possible candidates, and even in their case Moore maintains only that the requisite type of justification "may be possible" (p. xxii, italics in the original).

That being so, almost all our decisions will need to be made without relying on any rule: in almost all cases, Moore writes, "rules of action should not be followed at all" (Ibid., p. xiii). In all cases of this sort, individuals should guide their choice "by a direct consideration of the effects which the action may produce" (p. XX), doing what one thinks will promote one' s own interests, as these are enlarged by the lives of others in whom one has "a strong personal interest" (Ibid., XX) instead of attempting to satisfy the demands of "a more extended beneficence," as in "the greatest good for the greatest number." And of the goods to be aimed at, the more immediate are generally to be preferred to the more distant. In short, in virtually all our activities in our day-to-day life we are at liberty to live and choose without troubling ourselves about whether we are doing what duty, in the form of the rules of morality, requires.

Regarding virtues: a truly scientific ethic should promote the private virtues of prudence, temperance, and industry (the only virtues Moore discusses in Principia), not the (so-called) virtues of beneficence, charity, civic-mindedness, social justice, patriotism, piety, reverence, or altruism. Such an ethic should promote the virtues of the creative self, not the virtues of the conscientious citizen.

On this basis Regan argues that Moore genuinely is "Bloomsbury' s prophet," advocating, as he does, the values, the rules of conduct, and the virtues that are synonymous with the name, "Bloomsbury." As Regan notes, "theirs was an anarchy of the bedroom, not the streets."

Writing in the Library Journal, Leon H. Brody assessed the work as follows.

"Regan's thesis is that an adequate understanding of Moore's ethical philosophy can be achieved only when seen against the backdrop of Bloomsbury--the avant-garde group of free spirits (among whom were Lytton Strachey, Virginia Woolf, and John Maynard Keynes) who met weekly in London between 1905 and 1920. When seen in that light, Regan argues, Moore's thought as expressed in Principia Ethica is a "radical defense of the freedom of the individual to choose," rather than a defense of conformity to the status quo, as is usually assumed. Written with the verve appropriate to its subject, and yet philosophically scrupulous, this book deserves a place in philosophy and cultural history collections in both public and academic libraries."

Personal life
Regan and his wife Nancy had two children, Bryan and Karen.

Regan died of pneumonia at his home in North Carolina on February 17, 2017.

Selected works

Books 

Understanding Philosophy. Encino, California: Dickenson Publishing Co. 1975. .
Animal Rights and Human Obligations; with Peter Singer. Englewood Cliffs: New Jersey: Prentice Hall. 1976. 
All That Dwell Therein: Essays on Animal Rights and Environmental Ethics. Berkeley: University of California Press. 1982. .
The Case for Animal Rights. Berkeley: University of California Press. 1983. .
Animal Sacrifices: Religious Perspectives on the Use of Animals in Science. Philadelphia: Temple University Press. 1986. .
Bloomsbury's Prophet: G. E. Moore and the Development of His Moral Philosophy. Philadelphia: Temple University Press. 1986. .
G. E. Moore: The Early Essays; edited by Tom Regan. Philadelphia: Temple University Press. 1986. .
The Struggle for Animal Rights. Clarks Summit, Pennsylvania: International Society for Animal Rights. 1987. .
The Thee Generation: Reflections on the Coming Revolution. Philadelphia: Temple University Press. 1991. .
G.E. Moore: The Elements of Ethics; edited and with an introduction by Tom Regan. Philadelphia: Temple University Press. 1991. .
Defending Animal Rights. Illinois: University of Illinois Press. 2000. .
The Animal Rights Debate; with Carl Cohen. Lanham, Maryland: Rowman & Littlefield. 2001. .
Animal Rights, Human Wrongs: An Introduction to Moral Philosophy. Lanham, Maryland: Rowman & Littlefield. 2003. .
Empty Cages: Facing the Challenge of Animal Rights. Lanham, Maryland: Rowman & Littlefield. 2004. .
Other Nations: Animals in Modern Literature; with Andrew Linzey. Waco, Texas: Baylor University Press. 2010. .
Maud's Place and Other Southern Stories. Morrisville, North Carolina: Lulu Press Inc. 2014. .
A Better Life and Other Pittsburgh Stories. Morrisville, North Carolina: Lulu Press Inc. 2014. .

Films 

We Are All Noah (1986)
Voices I Have Heard (1988)

Papers

See also 
Animal liberationist
Animal liberation movement
Argument from marginal cases
Gary Francione
Intrinsic value (animal ethics)
List of American philosophers
 List of animal rights advocates
Peter Singer

Notes

External links 

 
 
Culture & Animals Foundation
Tom Regan Animal Rights Archive
Guide to the Tom Regan Papers
Guide to the Tom Regan Animal Rights Honorary Collection 2016
Tribute to Tom Regan, by Rainer Ebert
Animals 24-7 obituary for Tom Regan: "Evolved from butcher to leading advocate of vegan philosophy"

1938 births
2017 deaths
20th-century American non-fiction writers
20th-century American philosophers
American activists
American veganism activists
American animal rights scholars
Deaths from pneumonia in North Carolina
North Carolina State University faculty
People associated with the Oxford Group (animal rights)
Writers from Pittsburgh